Cody Horlacher (born April 10, 1987) is an American lawyer and Republican politician from Waukesha County, Wisconsin.  He was a member of the Wisconsin State Assembly, representing the 33rd Assembly district from 2015 through 2022.  He is currently running for a Wisconsin circuit court seat in Waukesha County.

Biography

From East Troy, Wisconsin, Horlacher graduated from East Troy High School. He then received his bachelor's degree from University of Wisconsin–Whitewater and his J.D. degree from Marquette University Law School. Horlacher then served as a special prosecutor  for Walworth County, Wisconsin. He is a member of the Republican Party. On November 4, 2014, Horlacher was elected to the Wisconsin State Assembly. He was re-elected in 2016, 2018, and 2020.

In April 2022, Horlacher announced he would not run for a fifth term in the Assembly, and would instead begin preparing to run for a Wisconsin circuit court seat up for election in the 2023 Spring election.

Personal life and family
He now resides in Mukwonago, Wisconsin, with his wife Karlee and his three children.

Electoral history

Wisconsin Assembly (2014–2020)

References

1987 births
Living people
People from East Troy, Wisconsin
People from Mukwonago, Wisconsin
University of Wisconsin–Whitewater alumni
Marquette University Law School alumni
Wisconsin lawyers
Republican Party members of the Wisconsin State Assembly
21st-century American politicians